Broken is a 2012 British coming-of-age drama film directed by Rufus Norris starring Eloise Laurence and Tim Roth. The film premiered at the Cannes Film Festival in May 2012. It is based on the 2008 novel of the same name by Daniel Clay, which was partly inspired by Harper Lee's 1960 novel To Kill a Mockingbird.

Plot
Eleven-year-old diabetic Emily 'Skunk' Cunningham lives with her solicitor father Archie, her elder brother Jed, and au pair Kasia on a cul-de-sac in a British suburb. One of her few friends is Rick, a slightly simple young man living with his parents in a nearby house.

Skunk is shocked when Rick gets beaten up by single-father Mr. Oswald, another neighbour: one of three of his daughters (Saskia, Susan, and Sunrise) has falsely accused Rick of rape. He is released when she is proven a liar, but he closes himself off. From then on Skunk's life goes downhill.

Kasia splits up with her boyfriend Mike, who is also Skunk's favourite teacher. Rick is put into a mental ward as he isolates himself more and more. Archie and Kasia are beginning a relationship, a shock to both Mike and Skunk. Oswald's daughters start bullying Skunk when the new term starts. Her first boyfriend suddenly has to move away, and does not tell her until the day before he leaves.

One of Oswald's daughters, Susan, gets pregnant by one of her many sexual partners, panics, and falsely accuses Mike. Oswald barges into Skunk's classroom and beats Mike. While Oswald is in jail, Archie provides legal services to Mike, and the three daughters throw a drunken party. Susan miscarries at a house party, then dies, leading to Oswald's release.

Skunk secretly visits Rick when he has his first weekend at home. When she enters the house, she finds that Rick has accidentally broken his mother's neck, pushing her down the stairs, then panicked and knocked out his father. He won't let Skunk leave and does not realise Skunk's diabetes takes her into a hypoglycemic coma. Oswald finds Skunk, and a dead Rick (suicide), and gets her to hospital.

In a dream sequence, Skunk bids farewell to people from her childhood, including the recently dead, then sees her grown self, holding her baby. She wakes up in the hospital, with her father at her side.

Cast

Tim Roth as Archie
Cillian Murphy as Mike Kiernan
Rory Kinnear as Bob Oswald
Robert Emms as Rick
Zana Marjanović as Kasia
Clare Burt as Mrs Buckley
Bill Milner as Jed
Denis Lawson as Mr Buckley
Eloise Laurence as Skunk
Michael Shaeffer as Desk Sergeant
Martha Bryant as Sunrise
Faye Daveney, as Saskia
Rosalie Kosky-Hensman as Susan
Lily James as older Skunk

Reception

Accolades
Broken premiered at the Cannes Film Festival 2012. It won Grand Prix of Odessa International Film Festival in 2012. The film received the Golden Eye Award for best international film on the Zurich Film Festival. It also won The British Independent Film Awards 2012 for Best British Independent Film.

Critical reception
The film received mixed to positive reviews by critics. It holds a 62% rating on Rotten Tomatoes based on 50 reviews and reports a rating average of 6.0 out of 10.

See also
 List of films featuring diabetes

References

External links
 
 Wild Bunch International Sales

2012 films
2012 drama films
2010s coming-of-age drama films
2010s English-language films
British coming-of-age drama films
Febiofest award winners
Films about dysfunctional families
Films based on British novels
2010s British films